Graf's hybrid frog (Pelophylax kl. grafi) is a hybridogenic species in the true frog family Ranidae. It is found in France and Spain.

Its natural habitats are rivers, intermittent rivers, swamps, freshwater lakes, intermittent freshwater lakes, freshwater marshes, intermittent freshwater marshes, arable land, pastureland, and heavily degraded former forest.
It is becoming rare due to habitat loss.

See also 
 Hybridogenesis in water frogs

References

Amphibians of Europe
grafi
Amphibia hybrids
Amphibians described in 1995
Taxonomy articles created by Polbot